Technical informatics is a European computer engineering equivalent, which includes, among others, digital logic and computational circuits, processor design, logic synthesis, computer architecture and organisation, low-level programming, firmware design, digital signal processing, embedded systems and physical computing. 

This discipline is usually taught at vocational universities up to a master's degree level.

Literature

References

See also 
 alternative computing
 computer architecture

Computer science education